Third Act is the third full-length album by the Swedish/Danish band Evil Masquerade.

Track listing
All songs written by Henrik Flyman.

Black Ravens Cry was released as a single in 2012 by Dark Minstrel Music

Personnel
Evil Masquerade
Henrik Flyman – guitar, vocals, keyboard
Apollo Papathanasio – lead vocals
Dennis Buhl – drums
Thor Jeppesen – bass

Additional performer
David Rosenthal – keyboard
Richard Andersson – keyboard

Production
Written, composed, arranged and produced by Henrik Flyman.
Recorded by Henrik Flyman at Digital Bitch, drums recorded at Stonelab Studio by Steen Mogensen, David Rosenthal's keyboard at Sonic Adventures Studio by David Rosenthal, Richard Andersson's keyboard recorded at Lipton Studio by Richard Andersson.
Mixed and mastered by Tommy Hansen at Jailhouse Studios.
Paintings by Katja Handberg.
Photos by Thomas Trane.
Artwork by Gunbarrel Offensive Design.

References

Evil Masquerade albums
2006 albums